Cloud9 IDE is an Online IDE (integrated development environment), published as open source from version 2.0, until version 3.0. It supports multiple programming languages, including C, C++, PHP, Ruby, Perl, Python, JavaScript with Node.js, and Go.

It is written almost entirely in JavaScript, and uses Node.js on the back-end. The editor component uses Ace.

Cloud9 was acquired by Amazon in July 2016 and became a part of Amazon Web Services (AWS). New users may only use the Cloud9 service through an AWS account.

From March 2018, existing accounts on Cloud9's original website could be used, but new accounts could not be created. On April 2, 2019, Cloud9 announced that users would not be able to create new and use old workspaces on c9.io (aka original version, not Amazon Cloud9) after June 30, 2019.

Features

Some of the features of an older version included automatic code completion for snippets and identifiers, parenthesis and bracket matching, a debugger, and a gutter where line numbers and errors or warnings would be displayed.

Cloud9 IDE also offered syntax highlighting for various languages, such as C#, C/C++, Java, JavaScript, Python, and Ruby.

Particularly for JavaScript, it offered real-time language analysis, code reformatting, and refactoring facilities.

It was also extensible and customizable, allowing users to change themes, plugins, and key-bindings to make their preferred setup.

As an online IDE, it allowed simultaneous editing from multiple users by offering multiple cursors, and could support the creation of private and public projects. Users were also able to drag-and-drop files into projects and use tabs to manage multiple files. Projects could also be integration with Mercurial and Git repositories, as well as collaboration platforms like GitHub and Bitbucket.

Other features:
 Built-in terminal, with npm and basic Unix commands
 Built in Image Editor
 Support for the following code repositories:
 FTP servers
 Support for deployment to:
 Heroku
 Joyent
 Microsoft Azure
 Google App Engine
 SFTP/FTP

About
Founded in 2010, and based in San Francisco and Amsterdam, Cloud9 IDE was a privately held company. Cloud9 IDE raised $5.5 million in Series A funding from Accel Partners and product development software company Atlassian Software.

On July 14, 2016, Cloud9 announced that it had been acquired by Amazon.com.

Usage
Cloud9 is the native IDE for the BeagleBone Black single-board computer, which is primarily programmed in an extension of node.js called Bonescript.

See also
 Online integrated development environment

References

Amazon (company) acquisitions
Free integrated development environments
Open-source hosted development tools
Software companies established in 2010
Online integrated development environments
2015 mergers and acquisitions
2010 establishments in California
Formerly free software